Luddesdown is a civil parish in the Gravesham District of Kent, England.

Geography
This very rural parish, forming part of the North Downs Area of Outstanding Natural Beauty, is located in a dry valley to the south of Gravesend and is named after a scattered group of houses and farms around Luddesdown Court and its church next to it.

The civil parish also contains its main neighbourhood or street, Henley Street, and separate hamlets of Great Buckland (though split down the side with Snodland having essentially the Church) and Boughurst Street to the south; the valley narrows quickly the south to the appropriately named Buckland at the top of the dry valley floor.  In this steep valley, facing west, is a vineyard, Monk's Vineyard; east are these woods: College, Haydown, Brazenden, Scrubes, Wrenches, Goss Hilly and Red Wood to the north east.  Apart from this eastern edge, there are Fowles/Brimp, Luxon, Molehill, Freezelands, Round, Tom Loft's, Longfield and Henley Woods. These are part of the now long and narrow Rochester Forest, much of which would have been used for the chandlery/shipbuilding of the Medway towns.  Most afford access under the 2000 Act.  There are two country public houses within the area.

History
Luddesdown is first recorded in 975 as Hludes duna (Hlud's hill); in 1186 it was Ludesdon and in 1610 Luddesdowne. It is pronounced Ludsdun. In 939 there was a mound nearby called Hludes beorh - suggesting that Hlud was a prominent citizen.

The church, originally belonging to the local manor, dedicated to St Peter and St Paul has only II* listing status; it is part of the ecclesiastical parish of Cobham to the north. The church school now operates as a village hall.

The small Norman Chapel of Dode, now just inside Snodland parish, was also associated with Luddesdown. Dode village was ravaged by the Black Death in 1349; it never recovered and was erased from the map. The Chapel was restored in the 1990s and is an approved premise to conduct civil ceremonies such as weddings. It is on the W side of the minor road S of Great Buckland.

Luddesdown was a parish in Strood Rural District, though local tax levels were set and services were also provided by Kent County Council prior to 1974.

The Court itself is early mediæval and Grade I listed for its (inter alia) oak beam supported hall with 10 windows, five to each side, with flint and stone dressing of the whole building.  It has wall paintings to the lower chamber and 16th and 19th century extensions.  There is a 14th-century fireplace.

Sport and Leisure
The parish also contains a picturesque cricket club, founded in 1947, Luddesdowne CC.

References

External links

Luddesdown Parish Council website

Villages in Kent
Gravesham
Civil parishes in Kent